Joof, is a typical Serer patronym in the Gambia.  In French-speaking Senegal, it is written as Diouf, whilst in English-speaking Gambia, it is written as Joof. It is the surname of:

 Alhaji Alieu Ebrima Cham Joof (1924 – 2011), Gambian historian, author, politician and advocate for Gambia's independence during the colonial era.
 Alhaji Bai Modi Joof (1933 – 1993), Gambian barrister and defender of free speech and the press, younger brother of Alhaji Alieu Ebrima Cham Joof
 Hella Joof, actress
 Joseph Henry Joof (born 1960), Gambien lawyer and politician
 Lamane Jegan Joof (c. 11th century), founder and King of Tukar - present-day Senegal.
 Maad a Sinig Ama Joof Gnilane Faye Joof (died 1853), King of Sine (Kingdom of Sine)
 Maad a Sinig Kumba Ndoffene Famak Joof ( – 23 August 1871), King Sine
 Maad a Sinig Mahecor Joof (died 1969), King of Sine
 Maad Ndaah Njemeh Joof (c. 13th century), King of Lâ (var: Laa or Laah), in Baol, part of modern-day Senegal.
 Maad Semou Njekeh Joof (18th century), founder of The Royal House of Semou Njekeh Joof
Tamsier Joof (born 1973), dancer, choreographer, businessman

Notes 

Serer surnames